Ginnie Springs is a privately owned park in Gilchrist County about  northwest of High Springs, Florida, USA. It is located on the south side of the Santa Fe River, to which it is connected. The water is clear and cold and there are accessible caverns with a sand and limestone bottom.

Ginnie Springs has been privately owned by the Wray family since 1971 and began functioning in 1976. In the mid-1990s when scuba diving grew in popularity, Bob Wray opened the springs to the public. Due to the increasing number of scuba diver deaths, Wray took precautions by putting in an iron grate over the most dangerous part of the cave and placing warning signs for divers. The popularity of Ginnie took off and it became a nationally renowned diving spot which is still largely popular today.

Today in addition to diving, customers can swim, snorkel, canoe, kayak, stand up paddleboard, and tube along the Santa Fe River. Along the river, there are various springs travelers can enter and swim in. This is a source for bottled spring water. Due to the crystal-clear water of the spring, it is easy to view wildlife as well as wreaths underneath.

In 2021, the Suwannee River Water Management District Governing Board approved a permit that granted Nestle permission to take over 1.1 million gallons daily from the aquifer that feeds Ginnie and other nearby springs to expand its bottled-water operations. This has sparked a global outcry.  Environmentalists objected to the granting of the permit on the basis that it will continue the degradation of the state’s natural springs and rivers, among other objections.

Ginnie Springs is one of the most popular places in Florida to go river tubing. Tubing the Santa Fe River as part of the Ginnie Springs tube run takes about 1 hour to complete from start to finish. Near the springs the water is 72 degrees Fahrenheit but warmer in the river. Since it is a privately owned spring, there are few restrictions on tubers in the Santa Fe River. Tubers are permitted to use tubes of any size and are also allowed to consume alcohol—often excessively—while tubing. Ginnie Springs is one of the few springs in Florida which allows the consumption of alcohol on the tube run.

Ginnie is also well known for camping. Visitors can make reservations for water and electric campsites. There are 129 water and electric campsites in total, which are located across from the park's store.  A reservation is not needed for primitive campsites, but they are first-come, first-served.

References 

Parks in Gilchrist County, Florida